Trichocera is a genus of winter crane flies in the family Trichoceridae. There are more than 140 described species in Trichocera.

See also
 List of Trichocera species

References

Further reading

External links

 

Tipulomorpha genera
Articles created by Qbugbot